Acraea andromacha, the glasswing or small greasy, is a butterfly of the family Nymphalidae. It is found in Australia, New Guinea and surrounding islands. See the subspecies section for more details.

The wingspan is about 60 mm.

The larvae feed on Adenia heterophylla, Passiflora cinnabarina, Passiflora herbertiana, Passiflora foetida, Passiflora mollissima, Passiflora suberosa, Passiflora subpeltata, Hybanthus aurantiacus and Hybanthus enneaspermus.

Subspecies
Acraea andromacha andromacha (Timor Sea, Northern Australia to New South Wales)
Acraea andromacha sanderi  Rothschild, 1893 (Papua New Guinea)
Acraea andromacha oenome  Kirby, 1889 (Islands of South-Eastern coast of Papua)

References

External links

 Australian Caterpillars
 Images representing  Acraea andromacha at Bold

andromacha
Butterflies described in 1775
Taxa named by Johan Christian Fabricius